The Cleveland Pipers were an American industrial basketball team based in Cleveland, Ohio in the 1950s and early 1960s. The Pipers are mostly known for having played in the short-lived American Basketball League from 1961–62. They were also a power in the day's Amateur Athletic Union (AAU ) basketball and the National Industrial Basketball League (NIBL) which peaked in the late 1950s and early 1960s.

History
The team was first owned and run by Ed Sweeny, a shareholder in a company which handled plumbing, heating and air conditioning services for a number of companies and buildings in the city of Cleveland. Sweeny handled sponsorship for a number of Cleveland recreational sports teams and leagues, including his basketball entry which later became the Cleveland Pipers. Sweeny's winning industrial team was later purchased by the ambitious young George Steinbrenner, then a 30 year-old son of a Cleveland trading company owner. General Manager Mike Cleary later hired John McLendon,  the first African American head coach in professional basketball, to lead the squad. Playing under coach John McLendon, and later coach Bill Sharman, the team won the league's 1961-62 championship, the only full-season title in the league's short history.
 
Steinbrenner got his start in professional sports ownership with the Pipers, which he entered into the new ABL. The team's precarious financial situation was such that its home games took place in eight different arenas and gyms. These ranged from the team's primary homes at either Cleveland Public Hall or the Cleveland Arena to local colleges such as Baldwin-Wallace College, to high school facilities in Ashtabula, Lorain and Sandusky, and as far south as Columbus.

Upon his hiring, McClendon was able to convince a former college player he had coached, Dick Barnett, to jump from the NBA's Syracuse Nationals to the Pipers. Then, after the team's first season, Steinbrenner signed Ohio State University All-American Jerry Lucas. In the latter case, the signing enraged the rival National Basketball Association (NBA), which attempted to lure Steinbrenner and the Pipers into jumping leagues. The mounting debts and costs of that move proved too much for the then-young Steinbrenner, who folded the team just months later.

Even early on, Steinbrenner was meddlesome and irrepressible. Basketball lore indicates that at halftime of the November 22, 1961 game against the Hawaii Chiefs, he sold player Grady McCollum to the Chiefs at halftime.

Industrial league

The team sponsored by Ed Sweeny Co started in the Industrial A League. Opponents included Cleveland Twist Drill, East Ohio Gas and White Motors in this small eight-team division.

AAU and industrial basketball were popular in Cleveland then, as the city was not a college basketball hotbed, and pro basketball, such as the then-struggling NBA, was not yet strong in the city. The city's various sponsored industrial teams and local high school action therefore dominated then.

In 1958, the Sweeny Pipers won their league and they were then invited to join the nine-team Greater Cleveland Muny League, the top league in the city, for the 1958–59 season. Opponents included Bruscino Construction, Carney Auditors, Blepp-Coombs, and Cotton Club Beverage. The Sweeny team went 28–0 to win the league in 1959.

The team had strong local connections, with Cleary, coach Tom Nolan a former John Carroll University star, and guard John Hollis. Their first big star was 6'6" Cornelius 'Corney' Freeman, a former top scorer on Xavier's 1957 NIT team.

Sweeny also hosted several national industrial powers during the 58–59 season including Wichita Vickers, Akron Goodyear and the Seattle Buchan Bakers. His Pipers lost them all, a briefly discouraging fact. That Spring, with the college basketball season concluding, a number of college players were immediately available to be signed by industrial teams, which was common then. Sweeny signed several including future New York Knick Johnny Green and Kansas State All-American Bob Boozer. He also signed Tennessee State small college champion coach McLendon to lead the Pipers and his star Dick Barnett. On April 5, 1959, this revamped Pipers team hosted the Denver-Chicago Truckers at Cleveland Arena and won the game. The Truckers, like the above mentioned industrial teams, were part of the NIBL, and the Pipers were soon asked to join that circuit as their eighth team for the 1959–60 season.

NIBL/AAU 

The Ed Sweeny Cleveland Pipers went 16–16 in the 1959–60 NIBL campaign, which was won again by the league's long-running power, the Phillips 66ers of Bartlesville, OK. They also hosted and played in a number of exhibitions including a visiting Soviet Union team, The U.S. Pan American Games team, and the Saint Bonaventure University college team. New stars included Kentucky's Johnny Cox, 6'9" Gene Tormohlen, and Tennessee Staters John Barnhill and Ben Warley. All later played in the NBA. They were edged 84–82 by eventual AAU champion Peoria, and their signee Boozer, and finished the season in a sea of debt. Sweeny allowed Steinbrenner to take over the team in April, 1960. Steinbrenner had been a longtime AAU backer.

For the NIBL 1960–61 campaign, Steinbrenner's first big signing was Dan Swartz, the NIBL's leading scorer from Wichita. The Pipers went 24-10 in the now six-team league to win the NIBL title, the league's last. They then also won the 1961 AAU national tournament in Denver.

ABL
The American Basketball League played one full season, 1961–1962, and part of the next season until the league folded on December 31, 1962. The ABL was the first basketball league to have a three point shot for baskets scored far away from the goal. Other rules that set the league apart were a 30-second shooting clock and a wider free throw lane, 18 feet instead of the standard 12.

The American Basketball League was formed when Abe Saperstein did not get the Los Angeles National Basketball Association (NBA) franchise he sought. His Harlem Globetrotters had strong NBA ties.  When Minneapolis Lakers owner Bob Short was permitted to move the Lakers to Los Angeles, Saperstein reacted by convincing National Alliance of Basketball Leagues (NABL) team owner Paul Cohen (Tuck Tapers) and Amateur Athletic Union (AAU) National Champion Cleveland Pipers owner George Steinbrenner to take the top NABL and AAU teams and players and form a rival league.

League franchises were: the Chicago Majors (1961–1963); Cleveland Pipers (1961–1962); Kansas City Steers (1961–63); Long Beach Chiefs (1961–1963), as Hawaii Chiefs in 1961–62; Los Angeles Jets (1961–62, disbanded during season); Oakland Oaks (1961–1963, as San Francisco Saints in 1961–1962; Philadelphia Tapers 1961–1963, as Washington Tapers in 1961–62; moved to New York during 1961–62 season; as New York Tapers in 1961–62 and the Pittsburgh Rens (1961–1963).

On March 27, 1961, the Pipers announced that they would be joining the American Basketball League that would begin play that fall, with former Ohio State basketball star Jimmy Hull, a friend of Steinbrenner's joining the team two days later as a major stockholder in the franchise.

The Pipers had played their previous two years at the Cleveland Arena, but sought a new home to reduce the $750 per game cost to rent the facility. They signed an agreement with the city of Cleveland to play 27 games at Public Hall at $400 per game or 15 percent of the gross receipts. However, in early August 1961, Cleveland mayor Anthony Celebrezze asked to renegotiate the deal, asking for the same $750 per game that the Pipers had paid at the Arena. Steinbrenner refused and threatened to move the team to Columbus.

On September 14, Ben Fleiger of the Cleveland Press was named the team's new general manager. He replaced Cleary, who had left the position with the rival Kansas City Steers.

The Barnett Affair

Prior to the start of the facility controversy continued, McClendon signed his former Tennessee State star, Dick Barnett, on August 16 to a one-year contract for $13,000. Barnett had completed his second year with the NBA's Syracuse Nationals and had been offered a new contract worth $11,500 for the season, but his signing led to another legal dispute. On September 25, the same day that the Pipers began their preseason training camp, the Nationals announced plans to file a temporary restraining order to prevent Barnett from playing for the Pipers.

Syracuse cited the fact that the contract gave the team the legal option to maintain Barnett's rights, while Cleveland's legal team focused on the case of another ABL player, Kenny Sears. He had played for the Los Angeles Lakers of the NBA, but then signed a deal to play for the ABL's San Francisco Saints. The Nationals obtained that temporary restraining order on October 23, less than two weeks before the start of the regular season.

The situation remained unresolved for the next two months, with Barnett unable to either play or practice with the Pipers. Eventually, the Nationals won a permanent injunction, but agreed to release Barnett from their deal after a handshake agreement between Steinbrenner and Syracuse general manager Dick Biasone.

Jerry Lucas
After a strong recruiting pitch that lasted for more than a month, Steinbrenner officially signed Ohio State University All-American Jerry Lucas to a player-management contract on May 16, 1962. Lucas announced the signing in a bylined article in Sports Illustrated. His two-year deal was to pay him a yearly salary of $10,000 with another $40,000 part of an investment portfolio.

At the time of the signing, Lucas indicated that while the Pipers' offer amounted to less than the three-year deal worth $100,000 that was offered by the NBA's Cincinnati Royals, it addressed his interest in finishing work on his degree at Ohio State and his intent to attend graduate school. In addition, a portion of the investments had indicated that they would be willing to hire him once his basketball career had ended.

According to Bill Madden's Steinbrenner: The Last Lion of Baseball, Steinbrenner made plans in 1963 to acquire the Kansas City Steers, from the recently failed ABL, as part of an application to bring the Cleveland Pipers into the NBA, and a schedule had, supposedly, been printed for the 1963-64 NBA season with the Pipers playing the New York Knicks in the first game. Steinbrenner and partner George McKean fell behind in payments to the NBA and the deal was cancelled.

NBA petition
After Steinbrenner unsuccessfully petitioned to get the National Basketball Association to accept his team the following year, the Pipers disbanded. After the ABL folded, Steinbrenner had $125,000 in debts and personal losses of $2 million.

Players
Lucas did not play in any ABL games. Pipers players include the following:

Jack Adams
Willie Akers
Jack Allain
Dick Barnett - 1961-1962
John Barnhill - 1960-1962
Richard Brott
Johnny Cox - 1960, 1961–62
Jimmy Darrow
Archie Dees
Connie Dierking - 1961-62
Clarence "Bevo" Francis
James Guydon
Ron Hamilton
Max Jameson
Rossie Johnson
Bob Keller
Lowery Kirk
Grady McCollum
Jim McCoy
David Romanoff
Lloyd Sharrar
Larry Siegfried - 1961-62
Dan Swartz - 1961
Roger Taylor
Gene Tormohlen - 1959-1960
Ben Warley - 1960-1962

Year-by-year

Game log
FIRST HALF

November
Record: 10-5 ; Home: 5-1 ; Road: 4-4; Neutral: 1-1

December
Record: 9-12 ; Home: 5-4 ; Road: 3-5 ; Neutral: 1-3

January
Record: 7-8 ; Home: 4-2 ; Road: 2-5 ; Neutral: 1-1 

ABL FIRST HALF PLAYOFFS

SECOND HALF

February
Record: 9-6 ; Home: 5-3 ; Road: 1-3 ; Neutral: 3-0

March
Record: 10-5 ; Home: 8-0 ; Road: 1-4 ; Neutral: 1-1

ABL QUARTERFINALS

ABL FINALS

References

External links
Ohio History Central Cleveland Pipers
Book on the Pipers 

American Basketball League (1961–62) teams
Basketball teams in Cleveland